Glenflagler distillery, (also known as Glen Flagler) was located in Airdrie, North Lanarkshire, Scotland, produced the Lowland single malt whisky Glen Flagler.

Glen Flagler distillation commenced on 25 February 1965 and the distillery was subsequently closed in July 1985.
The Glen Flagler brand has subsequently been reformed under new ownership, and using a blend of Scotch whiskies to recreate the original flavours and the site was converted in an Inver House warehouse facility.

Glen Flagler was used in the Hankey Bannister 40 Year old blend, which was voted the world's best blended Scotch whisky at the World Whiskies Awards

Collectable Bottles 
Its bottles command prices between $600-$1500, and it is sold as a collectable whisky in auction houses such as Sotheby's, Christie's and Bonhams.

In December 2019, a premium bottle of Glen Flagler sold for a record $273,000 to an investor in Dubai.

This was two months before a bottle of Macallan sold at Sotheby's for a world record $1.9 million.

Sponsorship Activities 

Glen Flagler is a primary sponsor of several major sporting and cultural events. It sponsors the St Lucia Sailing Cup in the Caribbean,.

It is also the organiser and sponsor of the Fiji Rugby Masters.

References

Scottish malt whisky
Airdrie, North Lanarkshire
1892 establishments in Scotland
British companies established in 1892
Companies based in North Lanarkshire
Distilleries in Scotland
1985 disestablishments in Scotland
Food and drink companies established in 1892
British companies disestablished in 1985